Rockin' In Time: A Social History of Rock-and-Roll is a rock history book written by David Szatmary. It was originally published in 1987 and is now in its eighth edition (2014).

The book begins with a discussion the African-American culture and hits and its influences to creation of rock and roll. The first chapter explains in detail the relationship between racism in the United States and the birth of Rock & Roll as blues. Szatmary does an excellent job of providing a comprehensive, yet concise history of Rock and Roll as a cultural and historical phenomenon. In the last chapter, the book talks about the 21st century rock. The book includes 27 chapters.

References

1987 non-fiction books
2014 non-fiction books
Books about rock music
Prentice Hall books